Al Sada Mosque is a mosque in Djibouti City, Djibouti.

Capacity
Al Sada Mosque has the capacity to accommodate up to 1,500 worshippers.

See also
 Islam in Djibouti
 List of mosques in Africa

References

Mosques in Djibouti
Abbasid architecture
Buildings and structures in Djibouti (city)